Hillgrove is a  community in the Canadian province of Nova Scotia, located in The Municipality of the District of Digby in Digby County .

References
Gazetteer Information
Hillgrove on Destination Nova Scotia

Communities in Digby County, Nova Scotia
General Service Areas in Nova Scotia